This is a list of episodes for the American animated television series Metalocalypse, which was formerly aired on Adult Swim. The series is produced by Williams Street Studios and animated by Titmouse, Inc.

Metalocalypse made its Adult Swim Video debut on August 4, 2006, with its television debut two days later. The release date for the Season One DVD in the United States was October 2, 2007, one week after the release of The Dethalbum. The Metalocalypse Season One DVD was also released in DVD Region 4, on December 5, 2007. Season Two began September 23, two days prior to the release of The Dethalbum (the deluxe edition of which features the first episode of Season Two). On December 2, 2008, Season Two was released on DVD. On November 9, 2010, Season Three was released on DVD and Blu-ray. The Season Four DVD/Blu-ray was released on October 30, 2012. On October 27, 2013 a one-hour rock-opera special premiered on Adult Swim, entitled Metalocalypse: The Doomstar Requiem.

A total of 62 episodes of Metalocalypse aired, concluding the series.

Series overview

Episodes

Season 1 (2006)

Season 2 (2007–2008)

Season 3 (2009–2010)

Season 4 (2012)

Special

Future
In April 2014, in an interview on Steve Agee: Uhhh podcast, Brendon Small confirmed that a fifth and final season was in pre-production. Small was originally waiting on Adult Swim for an appropriate budget in order to end the show the way he wants rather than rushing it. But after pitching the idea for the finale to the network, they turned it down, stating that they did not have the budget for it.

In October 2015, Brendon Small announced a month-long social media campaign entitled "Metalocalypse Now" as an attempt to gather fan support to have Hulu and Adult Swim co-finance the final season of Metalocalypse. At the time it was thought to be successful, the finale to be titled: Metalocalypse: The Army of the Doomstar – The Final Chapter, and would be a miniseries on Hulu Plus.

In May 2016, Brendon Small said in an interview that he is "all but finished making Dethklok records" due to Adult Swim declining to continue with the final season despite popular support of the continuation. Small stated that as a result of the "Metalocalypse Now" campaign, financial backers had come forward to fund the Metalocalypse finale, but Adult Swim ultimately did not want to go forward and make a finale. Small stated that he does have plans to eventually finish the Metalocalypse story, but he cannot say how.

On May 12, 2021, Adult Swim announced a direct-to-video film is in development and will be released on home video and digital followed by streaming on HBO Max 90 days after along with a broadcast premiere on the channel.

Notes
 The airing of season 2 was suspended for six months between November 18, 2007 and May 18, 2008. The bumper for the episode "Cleanso" stated: "Next is the last new Metalocalypse of the year. It's taking a break 'til 2008. After all, the holidays are brutal enough, so you metal fiends will have to make do with the old eps or the CD, or go back to college and catch the tour before it runs out." Season 2 was relaunched on April 6, 2008, starting with "Dethwedding".
 Each episode of season 3 is 21 minutes long, season 4 returned to the 11 minute runtime.

References

General references

External links
 

List
Lists of American adult animated television series episodes